LORAN-C transmitter Saint Paul was the master station of the North Pacific LORAN-C Chain (GRI 9990). It used a transmission power of 325 kW. Saint Paul LORAN-C transmitter used as antenna a 190.5 meter (625 ft) tall mast radiator. The mast has been demolished.

External links
 http://www.tech-service.net/loran/LORAN-1.XLS
 http://www.megapulse.com/chaininfo.html

Buildings and structures in Aleutians West Census Area, Alaska
Saint Paul
Saint Paul Island (Alaska)